Amanat may refer to:

 Amanat River, a river in the Indian state of Jharkhand
 Amanat (surname)
 Amanat (political party), the ruling party of Kazakhstan
 Amanat (1955 film), a Bollywood film directed by Aravind Sen
 Amanat (1981 film), a Pakistani film directed by Rangeela
 Amanat (2016 film), a Kazakhstani drama film directed by Satybaldy Narymbetov
 Amanat (2022 film), a Russian film
 Amanat (Indian TV series), a 1997–2002 Indian soap opera television series that aired on Zee TV
 Amanat (2017 TV series), a Pakistani drama television series that aired on Urdu 1
 Amanat (2021 TV series), a Pakistani drama television series that aired on ARY Digital

See also
 Amanat Ali (disambiguation)